Kang Min-hyuk is a South Korean badminton player from Samsung Electro-Mechanics team. He is the national team member since 2017 and was also the part of Korean team that won bronze medal at the World Mixed Team Championship in 2021. In his junior career, Kang was the 2017 Asian mixed team champion as well.

Achievements

Asian Championships 
Men's doubles

World Junior Championships 
Boys' doubles

Asian Junior Championships 
Mixed doubles

BWF World Tour (1 title, 2 runners-up) 
The BWF World Tour, which was announced on 19 March 2017 and implemented in 2018, is a series of elite badminton tournaments sanctioned by the Badminton World Federation (BWF). The BWF World Tour is divided into levels of World Tour Finals, Super 1000, Super 750, Super 500, Super 300, and the BWF Tour Super 100.

Men's doubles

BWF International Challenge/Series (1 title, 3 runners-up) 
Men's doubles

  BWF International Challenge tournament
  BWF International Series tournament

BWF Junior International (3 titles, 1 runner-up) 
Boys' doubles

Mixed doubles

  BWF Junior International Grand Prix tournament
  BWF Junior International Challenge tournament
  BWF Junior International Series tournament
  BWF Junior Future Series tournament

References

External links 
 

1999 births
Living people
People from Suwon
Sportspeople from Gyeonggi Province
South Korean male badminton players
Badminton players at the 2018 Asian Games
Asian Games competitors for South Korea